In Marxism, a theoretician is an individual who observes and writes about  the condition or dynamics of society, history, or economics, making use of the main principles of Marxian socialism in the analysis.

Derivation of the term

The term, "theoretician" as used by Marx, originally had a much more specific meaning, where the theoretician is tied very closely to working class, and is part of the working class clarifying its struggle and expressing its interests. In The Poverty of Philosophy (1847), Marx remarks that "Just as the economists" - referring to the classical Political Economists - "are the scientific representatives of the bourgeois class, so the Socialists and Communists are the theoreticians of the proletarian class." In other words, they are partisan thinkers on the side of the working class.

When capitalism was relatively immature and the struggle of the working class undeveloped, their thinking took utopian forms and they would "improvise systems and go in search of regenerative forms". However, as capitalism matured and the independent class struggle of the proletariat developed, "they have only to take note of what is happening before their eyes and to become its mouthpiece". Once they grasp that poverty is not simply poverty but that it has "a revolutionary, subversive side, which will overthrow the old society", science - Communist thinking, to the extent that it incorporates this subversive side - "has ceased to be doctrinaire and has become revolutionary."

Marx contrasted this scientific, partisan role of the proletarian theoreticians, with the superficial neutrality of Proudhon, who attempted to rise above both Political Economy and Communism:

"He wants to soar as the man of science above the bourgeois and the proletarians; he is merely the petty bourgeois, continually tossed back and forth between capital and labour, political economy and communism."

In the Communist Manifesto, Marx and Engels no longer talk of the Communists simply as theoreticians, but emphasise that this one facet of their activity:

"The Communists, therefore, are on the one hand, practically, 
the most advanced and resolute section of the working-class 
parties of every country, that section which pushes forward 
all others; on the other hand, theoretically, they have over 
the great mass of the proletariat the advantage of clearly 
understanding the line of march, the conditions, and the 
ultimate general results of the proletarian movement."

To the extent that they are theoreticians, they are 'practical theoreticians', not abstractly analysing society in general or some facet of it, but devoted to understanding and clarifying "the line of march" of the proletarian movement. Henceforth, this was the task which Marx and Engels, the pre-eminent Marxist theoreticians, set themselves.

Thus, in a review of Capital, Marx's life work, which Engels wrote for the Rheinische Zeitung, he emphasised its importance for the German Social-Democrats, describing "the present book as their theoretical bible, as the armoury from which they will take their most telling arguments." In other reviews and correspondence Marx and Engels emphasise over and over the importance of this theoretical work for arming the working class.

By contrast Marx and Engels were extremely wary of the role of what may be described as 'professional theoreticians', however learned, who were only tenuously familiar with their theory and not tied to the struggles of the working class. Thus we find Marx writing to Sorge in October 1877, following the fusion of the German Social Democrats with the Lassalleans, complaining about the reintroduction of utopian socialism into the movement ("which for tens of years we have been clearing out of the German workers’ heads with so much toil and labour") by "a whole gang of half-mature students and super-wise doctors who want to give socialism a “higher ideal” orientation, that is to say, to replace its materialistic basis (which demands serious objective study from anyone who tries to use it) by modern mythology with its goddesses of Justice, Freedom, Equality and Fraternity." As their influence persisted, Engels remarked in a similar vein:

"we have ... quite given up all traffic with the people who want to smuggle this nonsense and these arselickers into the Party ... It will soon be time to come out against the philanthropic upper and lower middle class types, students and professors, who are penetrating the German Party and want to dilute the proletariat's class struggle against its oppressors into a universal human brotherhood organisation" (Engels to Becker, September 8, 1879)

Less pithily Marx and Engels explained their position to the party leaders:

"It is an inevitable phenomenon, rooted in the course of development, that people from what have hitherto been the ruling classes should also join the militant proletariat and contribute cultural elements to it. We clearly stated this in the [Communist] Manifesto. But here there are two points to be noted:

First, in order to be of use to the proletarian movement these people must also bring real cultural elements to it. But with the great majority of the German bourgeois converts that is not the case. ... there are about as many points of view among these gentry as there are heads; instead of producing clarity in a single case they have only produced desperate confusion – fortunately almost exclusively among themselves. Cultural elements whose first principle is to teach what they have not learnt can be very well dispensed with by the Party.

Secondly. If people of this kind from other classes join the proletarian movement, the first condition is that they should not bring any remnants of bourgeois, petty-bourgeois, etc., prejudices with them but should whole-heartedly adopt the proletarian point of view. But these gentlemen, as has been proved, are stuffed and crammed with bourgeois and petty-bourgeois ideas."
('Circular Letter', September 17–18, 1879)

Notable Marxist theoreticians

 Otto Bauer
 August Bebel
 Eduard Bernstein
 Amedeo Bordiga 
 Nikolai Bukharin
 Maurice Cornforth
 Onorato Damen
 Guy Debord
 Daniel DeLeon
 Georgi Dimitrov
 Hal Draper
 Rajani Palme Dutt
 Frederick Engels
 Antonio Gramsci
 Ernesto "Che" Guevara
 Abimael Guzmán
 Enver Hoxha
 Edvard Kardelj
 Karl Kautsky
 Karl Korsch
 Antonio Labriola
 Paul Lafargue
 Ferdinand Lassalle
 V.I. Lenin
 Karl Liebknecht
 Wilhelm Liebknecht
 György Lukács
 Rosa Luxemburg
 Mao Zedong 
 Karl Marx
 Iulii Martov
 Paul Mattick
 Franz Mehring
 İbrahim Kaypakkaya
 Anton Pannekoek
 Alexander Parvus
 Georgii Plekhanov
 Evgeny Preobrazhensky
 David Riazanov
 Joseph Stalin
 Mikhail Suslov
 August Thalheimer
 Palmiro Togliatti
 Leon Trotsky
Andrei Zhdanov

See also
 Agitprop

References 

Marxist terminology